A partial solar eclipse took place on 19 April 2004. A solar eclipse occurs when the Moon passes between Earth and the Sun, thereby totally or partly obscuring the image of the Sun for a viewer on Earth. A partial solar eclipse occurs in the polar regions of the Earth when the center of the Moon's shadow misses the Earth. It was largely visible over the south Atlantic Ocean and north shores of Antarctica, most prominently the Antarctic Peninsula.

The eclipse could also be seen in southern Africa at sunset. Considering the magnitude and the solar altitude, South Africa was the best place to observe this eclipse. In Cape Town, the sun was about 40% obscured, while in Pretoria the sun was 29% obscured. Further north, the eclipse remained visible up to Angola, southern DR Congo and Tanzania.

Images 
Animated eclipse path

Related eclipses

Eclipse season 

This is the first eclipse this season.

Second eclipse this season: 4 May 2004 Total Lunar Eclipse

Eclipses of 2004 

 A partial solar eclipse on April 19.
 A total lunar eclipse on May 4.
 A partial solar eclipse on October 14.
 A total lunar eclipse on October 28.

Solar eclipses 2004–2007

Saros 119 
It is a part of Saros cycle 119, repeating every 18 years, 11 days, containing 71 events. The series started with partial solar eclipse on May 15, 850 AD. It contains total eclipses on August 9, 994 AD and August 20, 1012, with a hybrid eclipse on August 31, 1030. It has annular eclipses from September 10, 1048, through March 18, 1950. The series ends at member 71 as a partial eclipse on June 24, 2112. The longest duration of totality was only 32 seconds on August 20, 1012. The longest duration of annularity was 7 minutes, 37 seconds on September 1, 1625. The longest duration of hybridity was only 18 seconds on August 31, 1030.

Metonic series

External links
NASA Chart of the April 19 Solar Eclipse
Partial Eclipse of the Sun - April 19 2004
Hybrid Eclipse of May 31: Future Eclipses, retrieved 2008-7-28

2004 04 19
2004 04 19
2004 in science
April 2004 events